The Miller Peninsula is a small peninsula in Clallam County, Washington and Jefferson County, Washington surrounded by Discovery Bay on the east, the Strait of Juan de Fuca to the north, and Sequim Bay to the west.  Small residential communities on the peninsula include Blyn, at the southwest corner; Diamond Point, on the northeast corner; Gardiner, midway down the eastern shore; and Discovery Bay at the foot. See Discovery Bay, Washington for additional detail on placenames in the area.

Peninsulas of Washington (state)
Landforms of Clallam County, Washington
Landforms of Jefferson County, Washington